The 1984 Bolton Metropolitan Borough Council election took place on 3 May 1984 to elect members of Bolton Metropolitan Borough Council in Greater Manchester, England. One third of the council was up for election and the Labour Party kept overall control of the council

21 seats were contested in the election: 13 were won by the Labour Party, 6 by the Conservative Party and 2 by the Liberal Party. In the Hulton ward, 2 Councillors were elected. After the election, the composition of the council was:
Labour 36
Conservative 20
Liberal Party 4

Election result

Council Composition
Prior to the election the composition of the council was:

After the election the composition of the council was:

L – Liberal/SDP Alliance

Ward results

Astley Bridge ward

Blackrod ward

Bradshaw ward

Breightmet ward

Bromley Cross ward

Burnden ward

Central ward

Daubhill ward

Deane-cum-Heaton ward

Derby ward

Farnworth ward

Halliwell ward

Harper Green ward

Horwich ward

Hulton Park ward

Kearsley ward

Little Lever ward

Smithills ward

Tonge ward

Westhoughton ward

References

 

1984
1984 English local elections
1980s in Greater Manchester
May 1984 events in the United Kingdom